Torry is a given name, nickname and surname. Notable people with this name include the following:

Given name
 Torry Holt (born 1976), American gridiron football player
 Torry Gillick (1915-1971), Scottish footballer
 Torry Larsen (born 1971), Norwegian explorer
 Torry McTyer (born 1995), American gridiron football player
 Torry Pedersen (born 1957), Norwegian newspaper editor

Nickname
 Torry Castellano, nickname of Torrance Heather Castellano (born 1979), American percussionist

Surname
 Clare Torry (born 1947), British singer
 Guy Torry (born 1969), American actor and comedian
 Joe Torry (born 1965), American actor and comedian
 John Torry (1800 – 1879), Scottish priest
 Mads Torry (born 1986), Danish football player
 Patrick Torry (1763–1852), Scottish Anglican bishop
 Peter Torry (born 1948), UK Ambassador

See also

 Terry (given name)
 Terry (surname)
 Torey (name)
 Torr (surname)
 Torre (name)
 Torrey (name)
 Torri (disambiguation)
 Tory (disambiguation)
Torny Pedersen